Gadila is a genus of small tusk shells, which are marine scaphopod molluscs in the family Gadilidae.

Description

Species
Species within the genus Gadila include:

Gadila brasiliensis
Gadila dominguensis
Gadila elongatus Henderson, 1920
Gadila fusiformis Pilsbry and Sharp, 1898, the fusiform toothshell
 Gadila gadus Montague, 1803
 Gadila hepburni Dall, 1897, the Hepburn toothshell
Gadila mayori Henderson, 1920, the Mayor toothshell
Gadila olivii Scacchi, 1835
Gadila pandionis
Gadila simpsoni
Gadila subfusiformes M. Sars, 1850

References

Scaphopods
Taxa named by John Edward Gray